Witalis Peak is a rock peak, 760 m, in the northeast part of Collins Ridge, at the confluence of Bowman and Amundsen Glaciers in the Queen Maud Mountains. Discovered and mapped by the Byrd Antarctic Expedition, 1928–30. Named by Advisory Committee on Antarctic Names (US-ACAN) for Ronald E. Witalis, meteorologist, South Pole Station winter party, 1961.

Mountains of the Ross Dependency
Amundsen Coast